HTE may refer to:

 Hatia railway station, in Jharkhand, India
 Happier Than Ever, a studio album by Billie Eilish
 High-temperature electrolysis
 Harvest Energy Trust, a Canadian oil and gas company
 Hatch End railway station, in London
 Helen Tulk Elementary, in Bishop's Falls, Newfoundland and Labrador, Canada
 High-throughput experimentation
 Hiller HTE, a helicopter
 Historical Thesaurus of English
 Horvitz–Thompson estimator
 Hydrogen telluride ion (HTe-)